Altitude, formerly known as 96 Iconic Tower, is a proposed skyscraper dedicated to the Sri Lankan Victory in the 1996 Cricket World Cup. The project is a joint venture between Wills Realtors (Private) Limited and the Shreepati's Edifice (Private) Limited incorporated in Sri Lanka, a subsidiary company of Shreepati Build Infra Investment Limited of India. The BOI agreement was signed by BOI Chairman Upul Jayasuriya on behalf of the Board of Investment of Sri Lanka and Directors Rakesh Chandra Pandey and Rajan Sirivastav signed on behalf of the Shreepati Group.

Features
The building will have
A revolving restaurant
A multiplex theater
An indoor cricket training academy
An amphitheatre
An observation deck
A cricket museum
A semi Olympic swimming pool
A gym, a spa and health club
Jogging/cycling tracks at podium level and many other features.

Security
LPG/PNG detector system in the kitchen
Public address system
Integrated building automation system
Voice evacuation System
Building Management System
All elevators having security card system
CCTV provided at all levels at various points
Video phone with intercom facility
Data kiosks
Trained security staff and fire stall shall be posted on duty 24x7
and many other security measures are planned

Design
As it is dedicated to the Sri Lankan cricketers that won the 1996 World Cup, the building's design is four cricket bat shaped structures with a cricket ball balanced between the handles of the bats. It also have some of the other symbols form the history of Sri Lankan cricket team. The tower is a blend of residential units, retail outlets and public space.

Public parking can be found on the lower ground floor, with lifts to the south leading to the ticket counter for the observatory on the 92nd level and the Sri Lankan Cricket Museum on the 93rd floor. Above this, four levels of retail outlets totaling 8366 sq m exists, connected by 18 escalators. Levels 4 and 5 host the multiplex cinema with capacity for 1,420 viewers. The two entertainment decks within the 96 Iconic Tower are in levels 14 and 66 which include a library, indoor gaming centre, business centre, jogging track, children's play area, outdoor play area, lounge and coffee shop, gym, spa, outdoor yoga area, and sky decks. Levels 15–49, 51–64 and 67–90 are dedicated to residential developments, and there are seven service floors in total. The revolving restaurant is on levels 94 and 95. The indoor cricket training academy is on the top story the level 96.

References

External links
 Official website 

Proposed skyscrapers
Residential skyscrapers in Sri Lanka
Apartment buildings in Colombo